This article contains a list of singles that have been certified multi-platinum by the ARIA.

Double platinum

 As Long As You Love Me - Justin Bieber featuring Big Sean
 Beauty and a Beat - Justin Bieber featuring Nicki Minaj
 Boyfriend - Justin Bieber
 Breakeven - The Script
 Breathing - Jason Derulo
 Chase That Feeling - Hilltop Hoods
 Cinema - Benny Benassi featuring Gary Go
 Drive By - Train
 Fight for You - Jason Derulo
 Get Along - Guy Sebastian
 Girl on Fire (Inferno Version) - Alicia Keys featuring Nicki Minaj
 Hello - Martin Solveig & Dragonette
 Hey Hey Hey (Pop Another Bottle) - Laurent Wery featuring Dev & Swift K.I.D.
 How We Do (Party) - Rita Ora
 If Looks Could Kill - Timomatic
 I Knew You Were Trouble - Taylor Swift
 I Like It Like That - Hot Chelle Rae
 I Will Wait - Mumford & Sons
 Inescapable - Jessica Mauboy
 International Love - Pitbull featuring Chris Brown
 It Will Rain - Bruno Mars
 Let Me Love You (Until You Learn to Love Yourself) - Ne-Yo
 Little Talks - Of Monsters and Men
 Live While We're Young - One Direction
 Love On Top - Beyoncé
 Mind Your Manners - Chiddy Bang featuring Icona Pop
 Need You Now - Lady Antebellum
 Nobody's Perfect - Jessie J
 Pound the Alarm - Nicki Minaj
 Running Back - Jessica Mauboy featuring Flo Rida
 She Wolf (Falling to Pieces) - David Guetta featuring Sia
 Sitting on Top of the World - Delta Goodrem
 Spectrum (Say My Name) - Florence + The Machine
 Stronger (What Doesn't Kill You) - Kelly Clarkson
 Summer Paradise - Simple Plan
 Sweet Nothing - Calvin Harris featuring Florence Welch
 Take Care - Drake featuring Rihanna
 This Is Love - will.i.am featuring Eva Simons
 Thriller - Michael Jackson
 Troublemaker - Olly Murs featuring Flo Rida
 Turn All the Lights On - T-Pain featuring Ne-Yo
 Turn Up the Love - Far East Movement featuring Cover Drive
 Turn Up the Music - Chris Brown
 We'll Be Coming Back - Calvin Harris featuring Example
 What You've Done to Me - Samantha Jade
 Wide Awake - Katy Perry
 Wings - Little Mix
 Worth It - Fifth Harmony

 Thunderstruck - AC/DC

Quintuple platinum

 Boom Boom - Justice Crew
 California Gurls - Katy Perry featuring Snoop Dogg
 Don't Wanna Go Home - Jason Derulo
 Don't You Worry Child - Swedish House Mafia
 Good Feeling - Flo Rida
 Grenade - Bruno Mars
 Hey, Soul Sister - Train
 I Gotta Feeling - The Black Eyed Peas
 Into the Flame - Matt Corby
 Just the Way You Are - Bruno Mars
 OMG - Usher
 Only Girl (In the World) - Rihanna
 Payphone - Maroon 5 featuring Wiz Khalifa
 Price Tag - Jessie J featuring B.o.B
 Raise Your Glass - Pink
 Sexy Chick - David Guetta featuring Akon
 Skinny Love - Birdy
 Tik Tok - Kesha
 Titanium - David Guetta featuring Sia
 We Are Young - Fun featuring Janelle Monáe
 Yeah 3x - Chris Brown

References 

Australia
Australia
Australian music-related lists